His Majesty the Hypochondriac is a 1918 German silent comedy film directed by Frederic Zelnik and starring Lisa Weise, Karl Beckersachs, and Grete Diercks.

Cast
Lisa Weise as Serene Hypochondriac
Karl Beckersachs as Husband of Serenity Hypochondriac
Grete Diercks as Niece of Serenity
Kurt Vespermann
Jenny Marba
Gustav Botz
Aenderly Lebius

References

External links

Films of the German Empire
German silent feature films
Films directed by Frederic Zelnik
German comedy films
1918 comedy films
German black-and-white films
Silent comedy films
1910s German films
1910s German-language films